Edgardo Martínez (born 17 April 1940) is a Salvadoran former footballer. He competed in the men's tournament at the 1968 Summer Olympics.

References

External links
 

1940 births
Living people
Salvadoran footballers
El Salvador international footballers
Olympic footballers of El Salvador
Footballers at the 1968 Summer Olympics
Place of birth missing (living people)
Association football defenders
C.D. Atlético Marte footballers